Claude Davison Ankney (1946 – February 28, 2013) was an American-Canadian zoologist and avian ecologist. He was a professor at the University of Western Ontario from 1974 until he retired from there in 2002. Academically, he was known for his work on the life history strategies of various birds, especially waterfowl. He was also known for his defense of, and activism for, environmental conservation.

Ankney was also a significant contributor to the History of the Rose Lake Wildlife Research Center - Michigan Department of Natural Resources, Wildlife Division Report (1988).

References

1946 births
2013 deaths
Canadian zoologists
Canadian ecologists
American emigrants to Canada
People from Cleveland
Academic staff of the University of Western Ontario
University of Western Ontario alumni
Canadian conservationists